
 
 

Murputja is an Aboriginal community in the Anangu Pitjantjatjara Yankunytjatjara in South Australia.

In 2007, four South Australia Police officers were based at Murputja and running patrols in the area. There was a rudimentary shed structure that served as a police station when police were present and some new housing had been built for police officers. As of 2018, the APY Lands were served by stations situated at Amata, Ernabella, Mimili, Murputja, Umuwa and the town of Marla. Specialist policing support is located at Umuwa, including CIB and domestic violence investigators.

See also
Murputja Anangu School

References

Towns in South Australia
Aboriginal communities in South Australia
Anangu Pitjantjatjara Yankunytjatjara